Wilhelmus ("Wim") Jacobus Koevermans (born 28 June 1960 in Vlaardingen, South Holland), a former football central defender from The Netherlands, who earned one cap for the Netherlands national football team. He was a member of the Dutch team that won the European title at the 1988 European Football Championship in West Germany, although he didn't play under manager Rinus Michels.

Koevermans played for Fortuna Vlaardingen, FC Vlaardingen, Fortuna Sittard, and FC Groningen. He ended his professional career in 1990. After that he became a football manager, who worked for clubs like NEC Nijmegen, RBC Roosendaal and MVV Maastricht.  He was the International High Performance Director of the FAI until he was appointed the coach of India. He resumed his office as the Chief Coach of Indian football team on 1 July 2012. He left the post in October 2014 after India's loss against Palestine.

India
Wim Koevermans was the head coach of the India national football team from the period of 2012 to 2015. He was succeeded by Stephen Constantine.

Coaching Statistics

Honours

Manager

India
 Nehru Cup: 2012
 SAFF Championship runner-up: 2013

References

1960 births
Living people
Dutch footballers
Netherlands international footballers
Dutch football managers
Dutch expatriate football managers
Eredivisie players
Eerste Divisie players
Association football central defenders
Fortuna Vlaardingen players
FC Groningen players
Fortuna Sittard players
UEFA Euro 1988 players
UEFA European Championship-winning players
People from Vlaardingen
FC Groningen managers
NEC Nijmegen managers
RBC Roosendaal managers
MVV Maastricht managers
India national football team managers
Dutch expatriates in India
Expatriate football managers in India
Footballers from South Holland